Miles Thornton (born April 2, 1994) is a Grand Prix motorcycle racer from United States. He races in the AMA Pro Supersport Championship for CTR Racing aboard a Yamaha YZF-R6.

Career statistics

By season

Races by year

References

 Miles Thornton profile at AMA Pro Road Racing
 Miles Thornton profile at MotoGP.com

American motorcycle racers
Living people
1994 births
125cc World Championship riders